Joaquín del Cossío (born in El Viejo on September 2, 1789) was a Nicaraguan politician, member of the Legitimist Party who served as acting Supreme Director of Nicaragua on two occasions, first alongside Evaristo Rocha until May 15, and again from July 27, to October 20, 1839.

José Núñez and Cossío were the most important figures in the Independence of Nicaragua, as they began the first and second transitional governments that lead to Nicaragua's independence.

Biography

Independence of Central America 
In 1824 he was a part of Governing Board of El Viejo presided over by Juan Bautista Salazar. Later that year, Colonel Juan Josê Salas, the leader of the ruling junta in León, appointed him governor of that city.

As Supreme Director 
He later served as deputy Supreme Director under José Núñez, the first Supreme Director. Although, according to the constitution, the term of office of the Supreme Director lasted two years, on January 5, 1839, Núñez handed over power to Cossío, making him acting Supreme Director. Evaristo Rocha was to essentially take up the position after him but they ruled somewhat jointly until May 15. It is unknown when Cossío actually took office. On May 21, the legislature elected him as the new official Supreme Director. Like his predecessor, Cossío resigned before the official end of his term, handing over power to Hilario Ulloa.

Policies 
By State Decree issued on August 27, 1839, he announced that the decision on the location of the Parliament, in accordance with the internal security and tranquility of the state, fell within the competence of the Supreme Directors. And by another State Decree, issued in León on September 2, 1839, the towns of San Fernando de Masaya, Santa Ana de Chinandega and El Viejo, rose to Villas.

He also signed a general amnesty by Decree of the Legislative Assembly of September 7, 1839.

References

Presidents of Nicaragua
19th-century Nicaraguan people
Year of death missing
1789 births